Khirbat Iribbin or Khurbet 'Arubbin (meaning "The ruin of Arubbin"), was a Palestinian Arab village in the Upper Galilee, located  northeast of the city of Acre. In 1945, it had a built-up land area of over 2,000 dunums and a population of 360 Arab Muslims.

Location
The village was located on the north bank of Wadi Karkara, about 1 km south of the Lebanese border, and with a view to the Mediterranean Sea in the west.

History
A  three-aisled Byzantine church (from the 6th or 7th century CE) had been reused as a village house.

Ottoman era
In 1875 Victor Guérin inspected the place, which he described: "The ruins of this name are scattered over the flanks and summit of a hill, bordered on the south by the deep ravine of Wady Kerkera. Terraces, once regulated by the hand of man and now overgrown with thick underwood, were formerly covered with dwelling-houses whose remains cumber the soil. The foundations of some are still visible. They were small, but tolerably well-built, with regular stones of fair dimensions.
On the door, still standing, of one of them, we observe a cross with standing, equal arms set in a  niche. It was built with cut stones worked in with much care and without cement. The southern facade was pierced with these
doors. Another door, the only one on that side, was constructed in the middle of the western facade; its lintel is lying on the ground. On the east was an apse, whose interior are in place. Within this ancient church are several monolithic columns half hidden  by the bushes; they measure 2.50 metres in length, by thirty-five centimetres in diameter. The capitals and the base are wanting, or at all events no longer visible. By the side of this building is observed a sort of subterranean magazine arched in stone with a circular arch. It is partly filled up. On the sumrnit of the hill the vestiges of a town can be recognised. It was approached by a number of steps.'

British Mandate era
In the 1945 statistics, the village (including Arab al-Aramisha, Jurdayh and Khirbat Idmith) had a population of 360 Muslims. A total of 2,637 dunums of village land were used for cereals, and 16 dunums were irrigated or used for orchards.

1948 and aftermath
During the 1948 Arab–Israeli War, it was captured by Israel's Oded Brigade on October 31, 1948, during Operation Hiram.

Following the war the area was incorporated into the State of Israel. Kibbutz Adamit was founded in 1958 on village land, to the west of the village site. The Palestinian historian Walid Khalidi described the village site in 1992: "The site is covered with the debris of houses. It also has a number of wells and caves.

Petersen inspected the place in 1991, and found that the remains of the village consisted of several widely spaced rectangular houses, one storey high. Most houses were made of rough field stones laid dry, but with traces of older coursed masonry in places. The roofs were flat, made of earth on top of short branches, resting on transverse arches.

See also
 Depopulated Palestinian locations in Israel
 List of villages depopulated during the Arab–Israeli conflict

References

Bibliography

External links
 Welcome To 'Iribbin, Khirbat
 Khirbat ‘Iribbin,  Zochrot
Survey of Western Palestine, Map 3:  IAA, Wikimedia commons 
Irbbin Khirbat, from the Khalil Sakakini Cultural Center

District of Acre
Arab villages depopulated during the 1948 Arab–Israeli War